Joy Kumar Mukherjee is an Indian Bengali film and television actor. In 2010 he acted in Target: The Final Mission and received Anandalok "Best Debutant" and "Best action hero" award.In 2011, he acted in Mone Pore Aajo Shei Din with Sayantika Banerjee. His 2012 film Astra was the most commercially successful movie in his career, following the success of Target in 2010. He appeared in the television series Chokher Tara Tui on Star Jalsha.

In 2019,Joy appeared in the Bengali television channel Sun Bangla for Jiyon Kathi followed by another comeback in 2022 for Star Jalsha in Bikram betal.

Filmography

Film

Television

Awards and nominations

References

External links
 My Photographs | Joy Kumar Mukherjee

Living people
Indian male film actors
1987 births